Hazel Forbes (born Hazel Froidevaux, November 26, 1910 – November 19, 1980) was an American dancer and actress.

Beauty pageants 
Her professional career began at one of the Atlantic City, New Jersey beauty pageants where she won honors as Miss Long Island. Forbes was 16 when she was chosen Miss United States in the Paris International Beauty Pageant of 1926.

Stage 

She became a showgirl in New York City at the age of 17 in 1927. She was hired away from Florenz Ziegfeld and his Ziegfeld Follies by Broadway theatre producer Earl Carroll. This was for a January 1929 production at his Earl Carroll Theatre. Carroll tempted Forbes with a substantial offer for a new dance review. Ziegfeld eventually won the struggle and Forbes starred in Whoopee! which opened December 4, 1928 and Rosalie which opened January 10, 1928., in support of Eddie Cantor. In 1930 she was in Simple Simon, a musical comedy by Guy Bolton - which opened on February 18. She also appeared in a short run of "Steel" by John Wexley at the Webster Hall in 1932.

Personal life 
Forbes married automobile salesman, Harry Judson, in 1928 and they divorced in 1930. In 1931 she wed Paul Owen Richmond in Kennedyville, Maryland. They were happy together but Richmond died suddenly in 1932. He left Forbes a fortune estimated at $2,000,000 from his dentifrice and hair shampoo interests.

She met entertainer Harry Richman and married him on April 16, 1938, in Palm Springs, California. The Maid of Honor was Glenda Farrell and the Best Man was Joseph M. Schenck. Richman reportedly spent $30,000 on the wedding with $5,000 on flowers alone. The wedding ended in divorce in 1941. The divorce was on the grounds of "cruelty".

Playboy night-club singer Harry Richman was well known for his earlier romances with Clara Bow, Dorothy Darrell, showgirl Edith Roark, Virginia Biddle, Lina Basquette, Peggy Hopkins Joyce, and Lenore Ulric. He and Forbes shared a sumptuous home in Beechhurst, Long Island. Shortly after their wedding, Forbes contracted pneumonia and was saved, in part, through the use of the drug sulfanilimide. The couple considered adopting a baby.

By 1942, Forbes was divorced from Richman and was being wooed by millionaire Max Bamberger.

Film 
Forbes went to Hollywood and made a number of shorts and films. In 1929, she was in Harry Rosenthal and His Bath and Tennis Club Orchestra, 1930 she was in The Fight& Seeing-Off Service, and in 1934 she was in the movies Bachelor Bait, If This Isn't Love and Down to Their Last Yacht. She received a series of threatening letters which dissuaded her from continuing in motion pictures. She donated her salary as a movie extra to charity because of the money she was willed by Richmond.

Death 
Hazel Forbes died in 1980 in Los Angeles, California.  She is buried in the Great Mausoleum at Forest Lawn Memorial Park in Glendale, California.

References
 
Albuquerque, New Mexico Journal, "The Slippers, James, and Draw Up an Armchair Before the Fire for Mr. Harry Richman", July 16, 1939, Page 16.
Fresno Bee, "Where Fifty Million Dollars Works For $7.50 A Day", August 12, 1934, Page 36.
Gettysburg, Pennsylvania Times, "Millionaire Weds Beauty in Maryland Town Saturday",  May 12, 1931, Page 2.
Kingsport, Tennessee Times, "Carroll One Up", January 1, 1929, Page 1.
Lincoln Star, "Miss United States of 1926 Wedded for Second Time at 21", May 12, 1931, Page 11.
Lowell, Massachusetts Sun, "Dorothy Kilgallen", March 13, 1942, Page 69.

External links

20th-century American actresses
American film actresses
American female dancers
Dancers from South Dakota
1910 births
1980 deaths
20th-century American dancers